The origins of the surname Randolph: English and German: classicized spelling of Randolf, Germanic personal name composed of the elements "rand", "rim" (of a shield), "shield" + "wolf". This was introduced into England by Scandinavian settlers in the Old Norse form Rannúlfr, and was reinforced after the Norman Conquest by the Norman form Randolf.

List of people with the surname
A. Philip Randolph (1889–1979), African-American civil rights leader
Augustine Randolf (born 2001), Ghanaian professional footballer
Amanda Randolph (1896–1967), American actress and singer 
Anders Randolf (1870–1930), Danish-American actor
Ann Cary Randolph Morris (1774–1837), a/k/a Nancy Randolph, American anti-slavery activist
Arthur Raymond Randolph (born 1943), American judge
Beverley Randolph (1754–1797), American politician from Virginia, eighth Governor of Virginia (1788–1791)
Cyril Randolph (1826–1912), English cricketer and clergyman
Darren Randolph, an Irish professional footballer
Edmund Randolph (1753–1813), politician from Virginia
Epes Randolph (1856–1921), American civil engineer and businessman
George W. Randolph (1818–1867), grandson of Thomas Jefferson and Secretary of War of the Confederate States of America.
Homer Louis "Boots" Randolph III (1927–2007), American musician
Isabel Randolph (1889–1973), American character actress
Jane Randolph (1915–2009), American actress
Jennings Randolph (1902–1998), politician from West Virginia
John Randolph, 3rd Earl of Moray (died 1346), joint regent of Scotland, son of the 1st earl and brother of the 2nd
Sir John Randolph (1693–1737), Speaker of the House of Burgesses and Attorney General for the Colony of Virginia
John Randolph (loyalist) (1727–1784), lawyer and king's attorney for Virginia from 1766 until he left for Britain at the outset of the American Revolution
John Randolph of Roanoke (1773–1833), American politician
Joyce Randolph (born 1924), American actress
 Levi Randolph (born 1992), American basketball player for Hapoel Jerusalem of the Israeli Basketball Premier League
Lillian Randolph (1898–1980), American actress and singer
Lingan S. Randolph (1859-1922), American mechanical and consulting engineer
Lonnie Randolph (Indiana politician) (born 1949), Indiana State Senator
Lowell Fitz Randolph (1894-1980), American botanist and orofessor of botany, Cornell University
Mary Randolph (1762–1828), Virginia author
M. J. Randolph (born 1999), American basketball player
Ned Randolph (1942-2016), American politician
Peyton Randolph (1721–1775), first president of the Continental Congress
Paschal Beverly Randolph (1825–1875), American medical doctor, occultist, and writer
Richard Randolph (1686–1749), House of Burgesses member, Treasurer of Virginia
Richard Randolph of Bizarre (1770–1796), Virginia planter
Robert Randolph and the Family Band, American musicians
Stephen Randolph (born 1974), American baseball player
Stephen Randolph (historian), American historian and civil servant
Thomas Randolph, 1st Earl of Moray (d. 1332), leader in the Wars of Scottish Independence
Thomas Randolph, 2nd Earl of Moray (d. 1332), Scottish military commander, son of the above
Thomas Jefferson Randolph (1792-1875), grandson of Thomas Jefferson 
Vance Randolph (1892–1980), American folklorist
Virginia Randolph Cary (1786–1852), Virginia author
William Randolph (1650–1711), Virginia colonist
William Randolph II (1681–1741), aka William Randolph, Jr. or Councillor Randolph, Treasurer of Virginia
Willie Randolph (born 1954), Major League Baseball manager and player
Zach Randolph (born 1981), National Basketball Association player for the Memphis Grizzlies

See also
Justice Randolph (disambiguation)
Randolph (given name)

English-language surnames